Black Kapital Records is an American independent record label founded by Suge Knight.

History 

In early 2008, Death Row Records’ co-founder and former CEO Suge Knight formed a new record company called Black Kapital Records as a vehicle of releases after his former label Death Row Records filed for bankruptcy, rumored to be due to having few artists and Knight's prison time. Suge Knight alongside Manager Nino Cappuccino, Young Life and label A&R executive Lesane Casino debuted a reality show called Unfinished Business. The show was based on Knight dispelling long-standing rumors in sit down interviews, his days with Death Row and the artists he worked with, and finding new talent for his record label. On September 20, 2018, Knight pleaded no contest to voluntary manslaughter and was sentenced to 28 years in prison.

Roster

Current artists

Lesane Casino

Former artists

Young Life

See also

 List of record labels
 Death Row Records

Discography

Upcoming releases

Awards and nominations

References

2. Brown, Jake. Suge Knight: The Rise, Fall, and Rise of Death Row Records: The Story of Marion "Suge" Knight, a Hard Hitting Study of One Man, One Company That Changed the Course of American Music Forever. Amber Books, October 1, 2001, 218 pp. 

American independent record labels